The 1991–92 season saw Rochdale compete in their 18th consecutive season in the Football League Fourth Division.

Statistics
																												
																												

|}

Final League Table

Competitions

Football League Fourth Division

Expunged

F.A. Cup

League Cup (Rumbelows League Cup)

Associate Members' Cup (Autoglass Trophy)

Lancashire Cup

References

Rochdale A.F.C. seasons
Rochdale